Stelis, or leach orchids, is a large genus of orchids, with perhaps 500 species. The generic name Stelis is the Greek word for 'mistletoe', referring to the epiphytic habit of these species. These mainly epiphytic (rarely lithophytic) plants are widely distributed throughout much of South America, Central America, Mexico, the West Indies and Florida.
Stelis is abbreviated Ste. in the horticultural trade.

Many of the older species were named by Lindley, Ruiz & Pavon and Reichenbach, while many of the recent species were named by Carlyle A. Luer. An orchid of the genus Stelis was probably the first American orchid ever to be brought to Europe. An herbarium specimen was depicted in 1591 in Tabernaemontanus' herbal book.

Description
A single oblanceolate leaf develops from narrow, leathery outgrowths from a creeping stem.

Most species grow long, dense racemes of small to minute flower in diverse shades of white. Other colors are rare. These flowers are photosensitive, only opening in the sunlight. Some close completely at night.

The three symmetrically rounded sepals generally form a  triangle with a small central structure, made up of the column, small petals and small lip, though slight variation to this theme does occur.

This genus is not common in cultivation.

Taxonomy
Cladistic research (by A. Pridgeon, R. Solano and M. Chase) has shown that the genus Stelis is monophyletic. But the distinction with several Pleurothallis subgenera is blurred (see Reference).

They are closely related to the massive genus Pleurothallis and Masdevallia. Although vegetatively the species show much variety, the flowers show a basic uniformity and are very similar throughout. Apatostelis Garay, Dialissa Lindl., Humboldtia Ruiz & Pav. and Steliopsis Brieger are generally included into Stelis.

History
The genus Stelis was discovered with Charles Plumier, a French priest and botanist who was sent by Louis XIV, King of France, to study the flora of the Antilles in around 1690. He collected numerous species in Dominica (Caribbean island) and other islands, and published his findings in a catalogue called Nova Plantarum Americanarum Genera in 1703. Later on, Nikolaus von Jacquin, a Dutch botanist who collected extensively in the Caribbean, published his findings in two separate works. In 1760, he published the first one called Enumeratio Systematica Plantarum quas in Insulis Caribeis, where he described the same plant as Plumier´s polynomial (Epidendrum ophioglossoides). In 1763, he published a more detailed second work called Selectarum Stirpium Americanarum Historia. Here, Jacquin describes a plant of his own herbarium with the same name (E. ophioglossoides)

Afterwards, on the “Expedición Botánica Española” (Spanish Botanic Expedition) sent by King Carlos III to study the flora of Peru and Chile, Hipolito Ruiz and Joseph Pavon complete results established 11 small plants of a new genus which they named Humboltia in honor of the renowned German explorer and naturalist Alexander Von Humboldt. In 1799, Olof Swartz, a Swedish botanist, studied the genus proposed by Ruiz and Pavon and found that it had been already used by Vahl to designate a Leguminosae. Because of this, he proposed the name Stelis in replacement of Humboltia. The species Epidendrum ophioglossoides was later moved to the genus Stelis by Swarz, and it is now the type species of the genus.

Species

Select species of Stelis include:
Stelis alata Lindl. – winged stelis
Stelis argentata Lindl. – silvery stelis
Stelis aviceps Lindl. – bird head stelis
Stelis barbata Rolfe – bearded stelis
Stelis bidentata Schltr – two-toothed stelis
Stelis ciliaris Lindl. – hairy stelis
Stelis crescentiicola Schltr – Crescentia living stelis
Stelis dalstroemii Luer
Stelis flexuosa  – flexuous stelis
Stelis gemma  – gem stelis
Stelis glomerosa  – ball stelis
Stelis guatemalensis  – Guatemalan stelis
Stelis intermedia Poepp. & Endl. – in-between stelis
Stelis leinigii  – Leinig's stelis
Stelis megantha  – giant anther stelis
Stelis palmeiraensis  – Palmeira stelis
Stelis pauciflora Lindl.
Stelis papaquerensis Rchb.f.
Stelis perpusilliflora  – West Indian leach orchid
Stelis porschiana  – Porsch's stelis
Stelis purpurea  – purple stelis
Stelis pygmaea  – pygmy leach orchid
Stelis triangulisepala  – triangular sepal stelis

References

 Dr. C. Luer  - Icones Pleurothallidinarum XXIV: A first century of new species of Stelis of Ecuador. Part 1 (2002); 
 Dr. C. Luer - Icones Pleurothallidinarum XXVI: Pleurothallis subgenus Acianthera and three allied subgenera; A Second Century of New Species of Stelis of Ecuador; Epibator, Ophidion, Zootrophion (2004); 
 Phylogenetic relationships in Pleurothallidinae .

External links
 
 

 
Epiphytic orchids
Pleurothallidinae genera
Orchids of Central America
Orchids of North America
Orchids of South America
Orchids of Florida
Orchids of Mexico
Flora of the Caribbean
Taxa named by Olof Swartz
Flora without expected TNC conservation status